Cameron Park is a census-designated place (CDP) in Cameron County, Texas, United States. The population was 6,963 at the 2010 census. It is part of the Brownsville–Harlingen Metropolitan Statistical Area.

Geography
Cameron Park is located at  (25.970707, -97.478659).

Demographics

2020 census

As of the 2020 United States census, there were 6,099 people, 1,381 households, and 1,239 families residing in the CDP.

2010 census
As of the census of 2010, there were 6,963 people, 1,269 households, and 1,199 families residing in the CDP. The population density was 9,962.4 people per square mile (3,835.9/km2). There were 1,366 housing units at an average density of 2,282.9/sq mi (879.0/km2). The racial makeup of the CDP was 87.05% White, 0.08% African American, 0.12% Asian, 11.93% from other races, and 0.82% from two or more races. Hispanic or Latino of any race were 99.28% of the population.

There were 1,269 households, out of which 69.0% had children under the age of 18 living with them, 71.8% were married couples living together, 16.7% had a female householder with no husband present, and 5.5% were non-families. 4.3% of all households were made up of individuals, and 1.9% had someone living alone who was 65 years of age or older. The average household size was 4.70 and the average family size was 4.81.

In the CDP, the population was spread out, with 43.4% under the age of 18, 13.8% from 18 to 24, 26.0% from 25 to 44, 13.0% from 45 to 64, and 3.7% who were 65 years of age or older. The median age was 21 years. For every 100 females, there were 101.8 males. For every 100 females age 18 and over, there were 93.7 males.

The median income for a household in the CDP was $16,934, and the median income for a family was $17,033. Males had a median income of $13,784 versus $12,805 for females. The per capita income for the CDP was $4,103. About 58.1% of families and 61.2% of the population were below the poverty line, including 66.4% of those under age 18 and 41.9% of those age 65 or over.

Cameron Park is one of the communities with the lowest income in the United States.

Education
Cameron Park is served by the Brownsville Independent School District.

In addition, South Texas Independent School District operates magnet schools that serve the community.

Discussion

Cameron Park was the subject of a This I Believe segment

References

Census-designated places in Cameron County, Texas
Census-designated places in Texas